The 2015–16 season was Fleetwood Town's 108th season in their history and second consecutive season in League One. Along with League One, the club also competed in the FA Cup, League Cup and JP Trophy. The season covered the period from 1 July 2015 to 30 June 2016, with competitive matches played between August and May.

Squad

Out on loan

Transfers

Transfers in

Loans in

Loans out

Transfers out

Pre-season friendlies
On 15 May 2015, Fleetwood Town announced they would travel to Germany as part of their pre-season schedule. They will play two matches during the week in Cologne, which one is against Borussia Dortmund B. A second friendly was confirmed on 6 June 2015, against Kilmarnock and a third against AFC Fylde. On 10 June 2015, it was announced Spanish side Getafe will visit on 31 July 2015. A day later they confirmed their second fixture during their time in Germany. On 12 June 2015, Fleetwood Town announced they will host Burnley on 28 July 2015.

Competitions

League One

League table

Matches
On 17 June 2015, the fixtures for the forthcoming season were announced.

League Cup

On 16 June 2015, the first round draw was made, Fleetwood Town were drawn at home against Hartlepool United.

Football League Trophy

On 5 September 2015, the second round draw was shown live on Soccer AM and drawn by Charlie Austin and Ed Skrein. Fleetwood are to host Shrewsbury Town.

FA Cup

Lancashire Senior Cup
On the Lancashire FA website the first round details were announced, Southport will face Fleetwood Town.

Squad statistics

Appearances and goals

|-
|colspan="14"|Players away from the club on loan:

|-
|colspan="14"|Players who appeared for Fleetwood Town but left during the season:

|}

Goal scorers

Disciplinary record

Notes 

The match between Fleetwood Town and Walsall on 12 December 2015, was postponed due to a waterlogged pitch. 
The match between Colchester United and Fleetwood Town on 16 January 2016, was postponed due to a frozen pitch. 
The rearranged match between Fleetwood Town and Walsall set for 26 January 2016, was again postponed due to a waterlogged pitch, with the match being rescheduled for 15 March 2016.

References

Fleetwood Town F.C. seasons
Fleetwood Town